Justice Olney may refer to:

Cyrus Olney, the 6th associate justice of the Oregon Supreme Court
Warren Olney Jr., associate justice of the Supreme Court of California